Pompiloidea is a superfamily that includes spider wasps and velvet ants, among others. in the order Hymenoptera. There are 4 families in Pompiloidea.

Families
These four families belong to the superfamily Pompiloidea:
 Mutillidae (velvet ants)
 Myrmosidae (myrmosid wasps)
 Pompilidae (spider wasps)
 Sapygidae (sapygid wasps)

The extinct family Burmusculidae, known from Cretaceous amber, is also placed here.

References

Further reading

External links

 

Apocrita
Apocrita superfamilies